Willy Wellens (born 19 October 1954) is a retired Belgian footballer, who played as both a forward or midfielder.

During his career he played for K. Lierse S.K., R.W.D. Molenbeek, R. Standard de Liège, Club Brugge K.V., K. Beerschot V.A.C., and Cercle Brugge K.S.V. He earned 7 caps for the Belgium national football team, and participated in UEFA Euro 1980.

Honours

Club

RWD Molenbeek 

 Belgian First Division: 1974-75
 Jules Pappaert Cup: 1975
 Amsterdam Tournament: 1975

Standard Liège

Belgian Cup: 1980–81
Belgian Supercup:1981

Club Brugge

 Belgian Cup: 1985–86

International 
Belgium

 UEFA European Championship: 1980 (runners-up)
 Belgian Sports Merit Award: 1980

Individual 

 Belgian Fair Play Award: 1988

References

Royal Belgian Football Association: Number of caps

1954 births
Living people
Belgian footballers
Belgium international footballers
UEFA Euro 1980 players
Lierse S.K. players
R.W.D. Molenbeek players
Club Brugge KV players
Standard Liège players
K. Beerschot V.A.C. players
Cercle Brugge K.S.V. players
Belgian Pro League players
Belgian football managers
K.V. Oostende managers
Association football midfielders
Association football forwards